Bima Bay (Indonesian: Teluk Bima) is a major waterway on the north side of the island of Sumbawa, and is adjacent to Bima City and Bima Regency (formerly Sultanate of Bima).  It contains the island Kambing Island (Bima), as well as the Bima harbor (Pelabuhan Bima).

External links
http://indahnesia.com/indonesia/SUBDIS/district_bima.php Bima Bay district

Bays of Indonesia
Landforms of Sumbawa
Landforms of West Nusa Tenggara